Faissal El Bakhtaoui (born 8 November 1992) is a French professional footballer who plays as a striker for Italian side U.S. Livorno 1915, and has previously played for Dunfermline Athletic, Dundee, Queen of the South, Difaâ El Jadidi, A.S.D. Nocerina 1910, Ħamrun Spartans and A.S.D. Nuova Florida.

Career

Dunfermline Athletic
Born in Saint-Tropez, El Bakhtaoui started his career with French club Racing Club de la Baie. In July 2012, Scottish First Division club Dunfermline Athletic signed El Bakhtaoui after he impressed then-manager Jim Jefferies in trial matches versus Berwick Rangers and Lochgelly. His first season with The Pars resulted in him mainly working on his development, with only two appearances being made in the latter stages of the season.

With Dunfermline's financial difficulties causing many first team players to leave the club, El Bakhtaoui started to feature in more matches, mainly in the second half of the 2013–14 season, where he went on to score four goals in 18 matches; two of which were in Scottish Championship play-off matches versus Stranraer in May 2014.

The 2014–15 season started even more brightly for El Bakhtaoui, having been included in the Pars team for most of the matches. In October and November 2014, he scored four goals in five league matches to help Dunfermline in their push for promotion to the Scottish Championship.

El Bakhtaoui's start to the 2015–16 season was even more impressive than the previous season, with the forward scoring four consecutive braces in the first four competitive matches of the season, scoring a further two against Scottish Premiership side Dundee in the Scottish League Cup. After attracting interest from other teams, El Bakhtaoui was named Scottish League One Player of the Month for the month of August, primarily for his achievement of scoring 12 goals in eight matches. El Bakhtaoui was once more given the player of the month award for March, after his goals against Stenhousemuir and Ayr United, as well as his first career hat-trick in a 3–1 win over Brechin City, helped seal the Scottish League One championship for the Pars.

With his contract due to expire at the end of May 2016, El Bakhtaoui once again started attracting interest from a number of top-tier teams, including Motherwell and Dundee. Although offered a new contract by the Pars, El Bakhtaoui announced in April 2016 that he was ready to move to a club in a higher league, and with the relationship between him and manager Allan Johnston breaking down due to the latter allowing the player a 15-minute cameo in the final game of the season, it appeared that El Bakhtaoui would be leaving the club at the end of his contract.

Dundee
In July 2016, El Bakhtaoui went on trial with English Championship club Blackburn Rovers, after former Dunfermline striker Owen Coyle had been impressed by his goalscoring record. After his trial with Rovers ended, El Bakhtaoui signed a three-year deal with Scottish Premiership club Dundee on 2 August 2016. El Bakhtaoui's first appearance for the Dark Blues arrived as a second-half substitute for Danny Williams in a 3–1 win versus Ross County in Dingwall. El Bakhtaoui made a further appearance as a substitute versus Rangers at Dens Park, before making his first start six days later in a 1–1 draw with Hamilton Academical. El Bakhtaoui spent the season playing out wide or behind the striker and finished the season with 4 goals. One of which was a goal of the season contender in a 2–1 defeat versus Celtic receiving positive comments from Celtic manager Brendan Rodgers.

At the start of the 2017–18 season in the Dundee Derby in the second round of the Scottish League Cup, El Bakhtaoui scored his first goal of the season, a half volley from 25 yards to help Dundee to a 2–1 victory. In 2020, his goal was voted as Dundee's 'Goal of the Decade' by fans via Twitter.

El Bakhtaoui returned to Dunfermline on 12 July 2018, signing a one-year loan deal with his former club. His return to Dunfermline was met with much fanfare, however, El Bakhtaoui's second spell with the club was far less successful than his first. On his second debut for the Pars he scored two goals in a 7–1 Scottish League Cup win versus Brechin City. He scored one further goal, a penalty against Greenock Morton in December. After returning to Dundee he was released at the end of the 2018–19 season, having scored just eight goals in 66 appearances for the Dee.

Queen of the South
On 9 August 2019, El Bakhtaoui reunited with former Pars manager Allan Johnston, signing a one-year deal with Dumfries club Queen of the South.

On 14 January 2020, Queen of the South announced  El Bakhtaoui as moving to Morocco to sign with Difaâ El Jadidi for an undisclosed fee. The Royal Moroccan Football Federation were reported in the announcement as interested in capping El Bakhtoui for the Moroccan national team (with their defence of the African Nations Cup scheduled to be April 2020). To be selected for Morocco, El Bakhtaoui would be required to be signed for a club based in Morocco.

Difaâ El Jadidi
Difaâ El Jadidi announced El Bakhtaoui's arrival at the club on 16 January 2020.

A.S.D. Nocerina 1910 
In February 2021, it was announced that Italian Serie D side A.S.D. Nocerina 1910 were undergoing the bureaucratic process to register El Bakhtaoui. He officially signed on 5 March. Just two days later, he would have a dream debut for I Molossi, scoring twice in a 3–0 win.

Ħamrun Spartans 
In July 2021, El Bakhtaoui was revealed to be in advanced talks with Maltese side Ħamrun Spartans, and would sign for them the following month. El Bakhtaoui would record his first goal for the club in a league win against Gudja United.

A.S.D. Nuova Florida 
In June 2022, El Bakhtaoui returned to Italian football by signing with Serie D side A.S.D. Nuova Florida.

U.S. Livorno 1915 
After a brief but successful spell with Nuova Florida, El Bakhtaoui signed with fellow Serie D club U.S. Livorno 1915 in December 2022.

Career statistics

Honours

Club
Dunfermline Athletic
Scottish League One: 2015–16

Individual
Scottish League One Player of the Month: August 2015, March 2016
PFA Scotland Scottish League One Player of the Year: 2015–16

References

External links

1992 births
Living people
French footballers
Association football midfielders
Scottish Football League players
Dunfermline Athletic F.C. players
Dundee F.C. players
Queen of the South F.C. players
People from Saint-Tropez
French sportspeople of Moroccan descent
French expatriate footballers
Expatriate footballers in Morocco
Expatriate footballers in Malta
Expatriate footballers in Scotland
Expatriate footballers in Italy
Sportspeople from Var (department)
Difaâ Hassani El Jadidi players
A.S.D. Nocerina 1910 players
French expatriate sportspeople in Malta
French expatriate sportspeople in Italy
French expatriate sportspeople in Morocco
French expatriate sportspeople in Scotland
Ħamrun Spartans F.C. players
Footballers from Provence-Alpes-Côte d'Azur
U.S. Livorno 1915 players
Serie D players
Maltese Premier League players
Botola players
Scottish Professional Football League players